Ghetto Millionaire is the debut album by American rapper Royal Flush, released on August 19, 1997 through TVT Records. The album featured various contributors, including prominent hip-hop producers Da Beatminerz, L.E.S., Buckwild and Hi-Tek.

The album reached No. 48 on the Top R&B/Hip-Hop Albums chart and No. 30 on the Top Heatseekers chart in Billboard magazine. The album spawned two charting singles, "Worldwide" and "Iced Down Medallions", the latter of which became No. 41 and No. 18 hit on the Rap Singles chart. For "Iced Down Medallions" became top-100 hit on the Hot R&B/Hip-Hop Songs chart.

Track listing

Charts

References

External links
 

1997 debut albums
TVT Records albums
Hip hop albums by American artists